L'equivoco stravagante (The Curious Misunderstanding) is an operatic dramma giocoso in two acts by Gioachino Rossini to an Italian libretto by Gaetano Gasbarri. It was Rossini's first attempt at writing a full two-act opera.

Performance history
L'equivoco stravagante was first performed at the Teatro del Corso, Bologna, on 26 October 1811. It was only performed three times before the police closed the production down, possibly because the text touched on the subject of army desertion. The music of the overture was subsequently lost.

The opera was first produced in the United States (in English translation as The Bizarre Deception) by the Bronx Opera in January 2004.

Roles
{| class="wikitable"
!Role
!Voice type
!Premiere Cast26 October 1811(Conductor: Giuseppe Boschetti )
|-
|Gamberotto, a rich farmer
|bass
|Domenico Vaccani
|-
|Ernestina, literature-loving daughter of Gamberotto
|contralto
|Marietta Marcolini
|-
|Buralicchio, wealthy young man, promised to Ernestina
|bass
|Paolo Rosich
|-
|Ermanno, poor young man, in love with Ernestina
|tenor
|Tommaso Berti
|-
|Rosalia, Ernestina's maid'
|soprano
|Angiola Chies
|-
|Frontino, Gamberotto's servant and confidant of Ermanno|tenor
|Giuseppe Spirito
|-
|}

Synopsis
Place: Italy
Time: Early 19th Century

Ermanno loves Ernestina, who is attracted to the rich, but foolish, Buralicchio. Ermanno's scheming results in Ernestina being arrested on suspicion of having deserted from the army (and really being a man in disguise), but he rescues her, and all ends happily.

Recordings

References
Notes

Sources

Gossett, Philip; Brauner, Patricia (2001), "L'equivoco stravagante" in Holden, Amanda (ed.), The New Penguin Opera Guide, p. 767. New York: Penguin Putnam. 
Osborne, Charles (1996), The Bel Canto Operas of Rossini, Donizetti, and Bellini, Portland, Oregon: Amadeus Press, 1994  
Osborne, Richard (1998),"L'equivoco stravagante", in Stanley Sadie  (Ed.),  The New Grove Dictionary of Opera, Vol. Two, p. 59. London: Macmillan Publishers, Inc.   
Tommasini, Anthony, "Classical Music and Dance Guide" (Refers to Bronx Opera production), The New York Times'', January 16, 2004. Accessed 8 December 2013.

External links
 Libretto in Italian  Retrieved 13 December 2012

Operas by Gioachino Rossini
Drammi giocosi
Italian-language operas
Operas